Opisthocoelicum is a genus of land snails with an operculum, terrestrial gastropod mollusks in the family Pomatiidae.

Species 
Species within the genus Opisthocoelicum include:
 Opisthocoelicum dubium Sánchez Roig, 1949
 Opisthocoelicum excurrens (Gundlach in Pfeiffer, 1860)
 Opisthocoelicum lamellicostatum (Torre & Henderson, 1921)
 Opisthocoelicum occultum (Torre & Henderson, 1921)
 Opisthocoelicum opisthocoele Torre & Bartsch, 1941
 Opisthocoelicum paradoxum (Torre & Henderson, 1921)
 Opisthocoelicum simulans Torre & Bartsch, 1941

References 

Pomatiidae